The Song of the Soviet Army or Invincible and Legendary or known recently as Song of the Russian Army is a famous World War II song written and performed at the war's end. Its performance was done by numerous artists, including the Alexandrov Ensemble. The original 1945 is highly triumphal with its brass fanfares and ecstatic chords extended upward with the aid of trumpets, as part of the V-E Day celebrations. That arrangement by A. Alexandrov is very much in the tradition of final choruses in 19th-century Italian grand opera, and shows how he originally envisaged this composition. There are many versions of the song.

This song also serves as the official song of the Russian Armed Forces today.

Original lyrics

Later Soviet lyrics

Modern Russian lyrics

4th Verse
Apparently, there's also a 4th missing verse in the song that rarely sung. The 1982 Red Army Choir concert use this verse as the 3rd verse when they sing the song.

External links
 krapp-sa.narod.ru webpage: list of Alexandrov Ensemble recordings. translated Russian→English by Google translate tool.
 Alexandrov Ensemble website. in Russian
 Sovmusic.ru webpage: list of Alexandrov Ensemble recordings. in Russian
 

Russian military marches
Russian patriotic songs
Russian military songs
Soviet songs